The Judge Killis Huddleston House, near Albany, Kentucky, is an Italianate house which was built in c.1900.  It was listed on the National Register of Historic Places in 1994.

It is a T-plan wood frame two-story farmhouse with a wraparound porch.

References

Houses on the National Register of Historic Places in Kentucky
Italianate architecture in Kentucky
Houses completed in 1900
National Register of Historic Places in Clinton County, Kentucky
1900 establishments in Kentucky